Sir John St John (by 1495 – 19 December 1558), of Bletsoe, Bedfordshire, was an English politician.

He was the son of Sir John St John of Bletsoe and his wife Sybil, daughter of Rhys ap Morgan. He succeeded his father in 1525 and was knighted the following year.

He was High Sheriff of Bedfordshire and Buckinghamshire for 1529–30, 1534–35, and 1549–50. He was a Member (MP) of the Parliament of England for Bedfordshire in 1529?, 1539 and 1542.

He firstly married, in 1521, Margaret, the daughter of Sir William Waldegrave of Smallbridge, Suffolk, with whom he had 5 sons (including John and Oliver) and 4 daughters and secondly Anne, the daughter of Thomas Neville of Cotterstock, Northamptonshire, with whom he had a further son and four  daughters.

References

15th-century births
1558 deaths
People from the Borough of Bedford
Knights Bachelor
English MPs 1529–1536
English MPs 1539–1540
English MPs 1542–1544
High Sheriffs of Bedfordshire
High Sheriffs of Buckinghamshire